You Have the Right to Remain Innocent is a 2016 non-fiction book by James Duane, a legal professor, published by Little A Books. It explains his belief why under almost all circumstances citizens should not talk to the police. He emphasizes that police officers tell their own children to never speak with the police.

Background
It stems from a lecture he gave to a law class that was uploaded onto YouTube.

Contents

He argues that because of Salinas v. Texas, the fact that someone has asserted the Fifth Amendment can be used as evidence against them in court, so he suggests criminal defendants and interrogatees instead invoke the Sixth Amendment, the right to legal counsel.

Reception
Mullins stated that it is "well written and engaging", with "concise, focused, and  persuasive" argumentation, and that he "effectively" caters to both the general public and to lawyers. She stated that the book does not express how to reform the legal system and that "The biggest criticism that a reader might raise is that Duane perhaps fails to give note to the struggles of police officers and prosecutors in finding, charging, and successfully convicting guilty offenders."

Kirkus Reviews stated that police officers and prosecutors are likely to dislike the book and that it is "Well-informed, scary, sobering".

References
 - Info page

Notes

External links
 (Video source)

2016 non-fiction books
Works about law enforcement in the United States